Asura sexpuncta is a moth of the family Erebidae. It is found in Myanmar.

References

sexpuncta
Moths described in 1894
Moths of Asia